MTV Unplugged is the first live album by Colombian singer and songwriter Shakira, released on 29 February 2000, by Columbia Records and Sony Latin. It was recorded on 12 August 1999, during her MTV Unplugged performance at the Grand Ballroom in New York City.

The performance was released in 2000 as a live album, and again in 2002 as a DVD. It was critically acclaimed by American critics and earned Shakira her first Grammy Award for Best Latin Pop Album.

Production and reception
The Unplugged concert was the program's first episode to be broadcast entirely in Spanish and served as her major breakthrough in the U.S. market. The concert is noted to be the "first time a Latin pop act attempted an Unplugged, the first Latina solo act to do so, and the first time a Latino act didn’t tape their performance at MTV’s studios in Miami."

The concert has received critical acclaim, and is included on lists of best unplugged performances. The performance is listed on Vulture Magazine’s “7 Really Good MTV Unplugged Performances” list. Nylon (magazine) has included “Sombra De Ti” on the list “10 Of The Best ‘MTV Unplugged’ Performances.” Yardbarker ranked the album at number 3 on their list of“20 greatest MTV 'Unplugged' albums.” . ”Remezcla” includes the performance on “The 10 Most Iconic Latin American ‘MTV Unplugged’ Performances.” MTV Unplugged has sold over 1.3 million units worldwide by June 2001.

Track listing 

Bonus features
 Timeline
 Albums
 Photo Gallery
 Making Of (½ hour program)

Personnel 

 Shakira - Producer, songwriter, arranger, lead vocals, harmonica, guitar
 Emilio Estefan Jr. - Executive producer
 Tim Mitchell - Producer, arranger, guitar
 Sean Murphy - Producer
 Marcello Anez - Engineer
 Adam Blackburn - Engineer
 Scott Canto - Engineer
 Sebastian Krys - Engineer
 Mauricio Guerrero - Mixer
 Eric Schilling - Mixer
 Tony Blanc - Mixing assistant
 Steve Penny - Mixing assistant
 Maurizio Teilla - Mixing assistant
 Bob Ludwig - Mastering
 George Noreiga - Guitar, backing vocals
 Donna Allen - Backing vocals
 Rita Quintero - Backing vocals
 Luis Fernando Ochoa - Guitar, arranger
 Ben Peeler - Lap steel guitar, mandolin, dobro, bazouki
 Pedro Alfonso - Violin
 Albert Menendez - Piano
 Ricardo Suarez - Bass guitar
 Brendan Buckley - Drums, percussion
 Ebenezer da Silva - percussions
 Myriam Eli - percussions
 Los Mora Arriaga - Mariachi Band on "Ciega, Sordomuda"

Charts

Certifications

Accolades

References 

Mtv Unplugged (Shakira album)
Shakira live albums
Albums produced by Emilio Estefan
2000 live albums
Spanish-language live albums
Sony Music Colombia live albums
Sony Discos live albums
Grammy Award for Best Latin Pop Album
Shakira video albums